Talkh Ab-e Zardpatak (also Romanized as Talkh Āb-e Zardpataḵ) is a village in Saroleh Rural District, Meydavud District, Bagh-e Malek County, Khuzestan Province, Iran. At the 2006 census, its population was 36, in 6 families.

References 

Populated places in Bagh-e Malek County